The Grove City Area School District is a small, rural, public school district serving the south eastern region of Mercer County, Pennsylvania. It encompasses the communities of Grove City, Pine Township, Wolf Creek Township, Springfield Township, and Liberty Township. According to 2000 federal census data, it served a resident population of 16,494. By 2010, the district's population was 17,687 people. In 2009, the District residents' per capita income was $17,309, while median family income was $45,646 a year.

Grove City Area School District operates: Highland Primary Center (Kindergarten and first grade), Hillview Intermediate Center (2nd – 5th grade), a middle school for grades 6th–8th, and a 9th – 12th high school.

Extracurriculars
Grove City Area School District offers a wide variety of clubs, activities and extensive sports program to middle school and high school students.

Sports
The District funds:

Boys
Baseball (Varsity/JV) – AAA
Basketball (Varsity/JV/9th) – AAA
Cross Country (Varsity/JV) – AA
Football (Varsity/JV) – AA
Golf – AAA
Soccer (Varsity/JV) – AA
Swimming and Diving – AA
Tennis – AA
Track and Field – AAA
Wrestling (Varsity/JV) – AA

Girls
Basketball (Varsity/JV/9th) – AAA
Cross Country (Varsity/JV) – AA
Soccer (Fall) (Varsity/JV) – AA
Softball (Varsity/JV)- AAA
Swimming and Diving – AA
Girls' Tennis – AA
Track and Field – AAA
Volleyball (Varsity/JV) – AA

Middle School Sports

Boys
Basketball (7th / 8th)
Cross Country
Football
Track and Field
Wrestling	

Girls
Basketball
Cross Country
Track and Field
Volleyball

According to PIAA directory July 2013

References

School districts in Mercer County, Pennsylvania